The Scotland national men's lacrosse team is governed by Lacrosse Scotland and is coached by Matt Bagley.

History

Prior to the Lockerbie air disaster in December 1988, the men's game had not been represented in Scotland since the turn of the 20th century.  The tragedy of Pan Am Flight 103 saw many Syracuse University students perish and on a memorial visit one year later the University's lacrosse team were surprised that there was no Scotland national men's team for them to compete against.  The country was challenged to pull together an inaugural and bona fide team; this was achieved some eight months later and following the 1990 World Championships the men's team played their first representative match.  Scotland has now played memorial games against Syracuse during visits to Lockerbie to pay their respects to those lost in the air disaster, and hope this fixture will continue into the future.

The 1994 World Series was a tremendous showcase for the sport and an opportunity for Scotland to make its name on the World stage.  Scotland wanted people in Scotland to hear more about this fine sport and inspire greater grass roots participation through the existing British Lacrosse Development Program.  The development game, Pop Lacrosse, a mixed sport played in schools is growing at an impressive rate. During 1997/8 Pop Lacrosse was introduced to nearly 100 schools in the Fife, Lothian, SW Region, Perthshire, Tayside, Central and Strathclyde areas.  The numbers of players coached was in excess of 10,000 and the number of PE teachers educated in coaching was nearly 250.

Since that time Scotland have been represented at every European and World Championships held.  Scotland have ranked 3rd in Europe and 6th in the World Championships.

World Lacrosse Championships

2014
This was the second World Championships with Head Coach John Kenney at helm, after an impressive 7th placed finish in 2010. Scotland were placed in the White Division and won all 3 pool games, scoring 61 goals in the process, and advanced to play Finland in the play-in games. Scotland overcame Finland and then New Zealand to advance into the quarter finals. A narrow defeat to the Iroqouis (10-8) saw Scotland face-off against Japan, with a place in the elite Blue Division at stake. After two periods of over time, Scotland took the victory (9-8). The final game of the tournament pitched the Scots against their 
rivals England in a fierce game that ended with another narrow defeat (15-13). Despite this narrow loss Scotland still finished in 6th place overall and will compete in the Blue Division in 2018.

2010
In the 2010 World Lacrosse Championship, Scotland was in the Turquoise Division.  They won their division with a 3-0 record, and finished with an overall record of 6-2, earning them a 7th-place finish overall.  Game results were as follows:

Roster

2006
In the 2006 World Lacrosse Championship, Scotland was in the "red division", i.e. the second tier. Results were as follows:

Red division standings after the round-robin phase of the tournament were:

Ireland
Scotland
Italy
Wales
Hong Kong

Finals
With the nations ranked amongst their division, they played off for their final standings. The winner from each lower group played a lower-ranked nation from Blue division for their shot at the championship. Scotland's results were as follows:

The final standings were:

Canada
USA
Australia
Iroquois Nation
England
Japan
Ireland
Germany
Finland
Italy
Scotland
Netherlands
Wales
Latvia
Czech Republic
Denmark
Spain
South Korea
New Zealand
Hong Kong
Bermuda

European Lacrosse Championships
Scotland has been represented in every European Championship, dating back to the very first one in 1995 in Prague-Pilsen, Czech Republic.  In the latest games in 2012, Scotland finished 6th out of 17 participating countries.

National Box Lacrosse team

The Scotland national indoor lacrosse team was reformed in 2018 through the generation of a domestic box lacrosse league and is currently managed by Brendan Cook (general manager), Brian Witmer (head coach) and Navi Mahal (assistant coach). The team will be participating in the World Indoor Lacrosse Championships 2019.

Under-19 team
Scotland made their first appearance in the Men's Under-19 World Lacrosse Championships during the 2008 tournament. The team placed eighth overall out of twelve competing nations.

References

Scotland men's
National lacrosse teams
Men's national sports teams of Scotland